Jason Aalon Butler (born July 17, 1986) is an American musician and political activist from Inglewood, California. He is best known as the former lead singer of the post-hardcore band Letlive. He is currently part of the rapcore band Fever 333 and the hardcore punk band Pressure Cracks.

Butler is known for his erratic stage performance, which involves high-energy nonstop movement, dance routines, smashing of onstage objects, frequent crowd surfing, and climbing festival stages.

Biography

Early life 
Butler was born and raised in Inglewood, California, where he was forced into maturity quicker than many others his age. He is the son of Aalon Butler, lead singer of the soul group, Aalon. Growing up with an African-American father and white Scottish mother, Butler at times had difficulty fitting in with a lot of the white children in his grade school, as they would sometimes ask why his mother was white and his father was not.

Musical career 
Growing up with his father being a part of the music scene, music has always been an essential part of Butler's life, although it was his uncle from Scotland who introduced him to rock music. He bought him the albums ‘Sixteen Stone’ by Bush and ‘OK Computer’ by Radiohead.  He states that Bush are still his favourite band. Other early inspirations include artists such as James Brown and Michael Jackson.

Letlive
Butler got together with Keeyan Majdi, Alex Haythorn, Christian Johansen, and Ben Sharp in 2002 to form letlive., a post-hardcore band based out of Los Angeles. The band have released four full-length records, and were signed to Epitaph Records. Each track features lyrics that come from personal experiences throughout Butler's life that he has been unable to say in any other way than through music. Butler states that in Fake History he was, "A little more apprehensive to say certain things, but challenged myself to say those things in The Blackest Beautiful." The band's fourth and final full-length album titled If I’m The Devil was released on June 10, 2016. On April 28, 2017, the band announced their breakup through social media sites. Butler was the only remaining original member of Letlive at the time of their breakup.

Fever 333
Following his Letlive break up, Jason teamed up with former The Chariot guitarist Stephen Harrison and Night Verses drummer Aric Improta to create Fever 333 in July 2017, a rapcore band who had their debut performance in a donut shop parking lot. On August 12, 2017, the band debuted their first studio recorded song 'We're Coming In' which takes aim at the police. Fever 333's debut EP Made An America was released on March 23 and Wall of Sound have given it an 8/10 stating it's a "raw, hard-hitting and in your face, but not only will it get your blood pumping and body moving, hopefully you’ll learn a thing or two about the cause and movement behind the band and how they intend to use their voices for the greater good of Americans and those feeling the impacts of authority injustice around the world." On January 18, 2019, the band released their debut full-length album Strength in Numb333rs and did a full-length tour with Bring Me the Horizon and Thrice.

Gentlemen in Real Life 
Butler created his own clothing line called "Gentlemen in Real Life," or G.I.R.L. In an interview with Blunt Magazine, Butler stated that he has always been passionate about fashion and clothing since he grew up with nothing. His artist for the line, Jonathan Whitehead, is a reputable artist known around the South Bay. Each week the brand releases a new item, ranging from clothing and accessories, to soap and oils. G.I.R.L is trying to redefine what it means to be a gentleman and how a gentleman would present oneself.

333 Wreckords Crew 
In October 2019, Butler founded the not-for-profit independent record label 333 Wreckords Crew, stating that "In my mind this community would thrive due to its unique focus on ethics, progressiveness, a symbiotic structuring and, of course, dope art". Signees include Nova Twins and Guerilla Warfare.

Personal life 
Butler follows a straight edge lifestyle and, while "it was a group of people I identified with", he has a skeptical stance towards the movement now because "it itself has shown me bits of the culture that have ostracised and been quite hateful to those that don’t subscribe." In an interview with Noisey, Butler stated that he has been sober since childhood because he did not like the "fever dreams" and "strange way of thinking" that are brought on by drugs. He has expressed that his reckless behavior "may seem like self-abandonment, but it is simply just me allowing myself to feel something that I wasn’t ever able to feel growing up" and that he does not believe in performing any acts that cause harm on others.

Butler married New Zealand musician Gin Wigmore in September 2014.
In June 2017, the couple announced that they were expecting a baby. Their first son, Pascal Nashoba Butler was born on September 7, 2017. They welcomed their second son in March 2020.

Discography 
Pressure Cracks
Pressure Cracks - EP (2018)
This Is Called Survival - EP (2020)

THE FEVER 333
Made an America (2018)
Strength in Numb333rs (2019)
Wrong Generation (2020)

Letlive.
 Speak Like You Talk (2005)
 Fake History (2010)
 The Blackest Beautiful (2013)
 If I'm the Devil... (2016)

Guest appearances

References 

1986 births
Living people
African-American rock singers
20th-century African-American male singers
American people of Scottish descent
People from Inglewood, California
21st-century American male singers
21st-century American singers
21st-century African-American male singers